Francisco de Caro (23 March 1898 – 31 July 1976), was an Argentinian pianist and composer. He is considered the most important representative of the tango romanza genre. He also performed in concert with his brothers Julio and Emilio de Caro in the Julio De Caro Orchestra.

Works

Flores negras.
Luciérnaga.
Mala pinta.
Loca bohemia.
Triste.
Páginas muertas. 
Sueño azul.
Dos lunares. 
Un poema.
Bibelot. 
El bajel. 
Pura labia. 
Colombina. 
Por un beso. 
Poema de amor
Aquel amor. 
Don Antonio.
Mala pata.
Adiós tristeza. 
Mi diosa.
Luz divina.
Mi encanto
Pura labia
Don Antonio
A palada
Era buena la paisana
Percanta arrepentida
Bizcochito
Gringuita
La cañada

References

External links

1898 births
1976 deaths
Argentine pianists
Male pianists
Argentine composers
Burials at La Chacarita Cemetery
20th-century composers
20th-century pianists